Cirill Makanda-Etogo (born 5 May 1980) is a Cameroonian-Russian former professional basketball player.  Throughout his ten-year professional career, he has played for four teams in Russia, plus teams in Germany and France before joining APOEL B.C. in Cyprus for the 2008–09 season.

Makanda represents Cameroon internationally and competed for Cameroon at FIBA World Olympic Qualifying Tournament for Men 2008 and FIBA Africa Championship 2009.  He was the leading scorer for Cameroon in the semifinals and bronze medal game, but the team lost both games to fall just short of qualifying for the 2010 FIBA World Championship.

References

1980 births
Living people
AEK Larnaca B.C. players
APOEL B.C. players
Apollon Limassol BC players
BC Avtodor Saratov players
BC Krasnye Krylia players
Cameroonian men's basketball players
Élan Béarnais players
Keravnos B.C. players
Russian men's basketball players
Russian people of Cameroonian descent
Shooting guards